You Are the Only One (lit. Only You, My Love) is a 2014 South Korean daily drama starring Han Chae-ah, Sung Hyuk and Ji Joo-yeon. It airs on KBS1 on Mondays to Fridays at 20:25 for 120 episodes beginning November 24, 2014, and ended May 22, 2015.

Plot
Owner chef Lee Ji-gun (Sung Hyuk) grew up seeing how his father's numerous affairs have affected his family and hurts his mother. He is afraid of getting into serious relationships and swears off marriage. However, all changed when he meets TV cooking show producer Song Do-won (Han Chae-ah) and falls for her.

Cast

Main characters
Han Chae-ah as Song Do-won
Sung Hyuk as Lee Ji-gun
Ji Joo-yeon as Nam Hye-ri

Supporting characters
Kang Nam-gil as Song Deok-goo
Jung Han-yong as Lee Byeong-tae
Moon Hee-kyung as Park Joo-ran 
Han Yoo-yi as Lee Ji-ae
Kim Min-kyo as Verillio Lee Nam-soon, a Kopino
Lee Hyo-chun as Ji Soo-yeon
Lee Young-ha as Nam Je-il
Sa Mi-ja as Kang Boo-nam
Kang Shin-hyo as Nam Hye-sung
Yoo Seung-bong as a television director
Jang Joon-hak
Kim Hae-sook as Oh Mal-soo
Choi Dae-chul as Noh Young-gi
Kang Joo-eun as Noh Woo-ri
Kyung In-sun
Kim Ki-woo
Ahn Jae-min
Hwang Kyung-hee

Viewership

2014

2015

References

External links
  
 
 

Korean Broadcasting System television dramas
2014 South Korean television series debuts
Korean-language television shows
2015 South Korean television series endings
South Korean romance television series